Dnieper River Line is a 1982 video game published by The Avalon Hill Game Company.

Gameplay
Dnieper River Line is a game in which the German defensive line of the Battle of the Dnieper is simulated.

Reception
Richard Charles Karr reviewed the game for Computer Gaming World, and stated that "Dnieper River Line incorporates the elements of historical accuracy, as well as fast-paced situation-in-doubt play to produce a well developed game which computer wargamers should "check out"."

Reviews
 Casus Belli #12 (Dec 1982)

References

External links
Review in Softline
Review in Softalk
Review in Creative Computing

1982 video games
Apple II games
Atari 8-bit family games
Avalon Hill video games
Commodore PET games
Computer wargames
DOS games
FM-7 games
NEC PC-8801 games
TRS-80 games
Turn-based strategy video games
Video games developed in the United States
Video games set in 1943
Video games set in Ukraine
World War II video games